α-Santalene synthase (EC 4.2.3.82) is an enzyme with systematic name (2E,6E)-farnesyl diphosphate lyase (cyclizing, (+)-α-santalene-forming). This enzyme catalyses the following chemical reaction

 (2E,6E)-farnesyl diphosphate  (+)-α-santalene + diphosphate

The enzyme synthesizes a mixture of sesquiterpenes.

References

External links 
 

EC 4.2.3